The Perseus cluster (Abell 426) is a cluster of galaxies in the constellation Perseus. It has a recession speed of 5,366 km/s and a diameter of 863′. It is one of the most massive objects in the known universe, containing thousands of galaxies immersed in a vast cloud of multimillion-degree gas.

X-radiation from the cluster
The detection of X-ray emission from Per XR-1 occurred during an Aerobee rocket flight on March 1, 1970, the source may be associated with NGC 1275 (Per A, 3C 84), and was reported in 1971. If the source is NGC 1275, Lx ~4 x 1045 ergs/s. More detailed observations from Uhuru confirmed the earlier detection and associated the source with the Perseus cluster. Per X-1 is the galaxy cluster at 4U 0316+41 designated the Perseus cluster, Abell 426, and NGC 1275.

The galaxy cluster is the brightest cluster in the sky when observed in the X-ray band.

The cluster contains the radio source 3C 84 that is currently blowing bubbles of relativistic plasma into the core of the cluster. These are seen as holes in an X-ray image of the cluster, as they push away the X-ray emitting gas. They are known as radio bubbles, because they appear as emitters of radio waves due to the relativistic particles in the bubble. The galaxy NGC 1275 is located at the centre of the cluster, where the X-ray emission is brightest.

Perseus galaxy cluster's Cosmic music note
In 2003, a team of astronomers led by Dr. Andrew Fabian at Cambridge University discovered one of the deepest notes ever detected, after 53 hours of Chandra observations. No human will actually hear the note, because its time period between oscillations is 9.6 million years, which is 57 octaves below the keys in the middle of a piano. The sound waves appear to be generated by the inflation of bubbles of relativistic plasma by the central active galactic nucleus in NGC 1275. The bubbles are visible as ripples in the X-ray band since the X-ray brightness of the intracluster medium that fills the cluster is strongly dependent on the density of the plasma. In May 2022, NASA reported the sonification (converting astronomical data associated with pressure waves into sound) of the black hole at the center of the Perseus galaxy cluster.

A similar case also happens in the nearby Virgo Cluster, generated by an even larger supermassive black hole in the galaxy Messier 87, also detected by Chandra. Like the former, no human will hear the note. The tone is variable, and even lower than those generated by NGC 1275, from 56 octaves below middle C on minor eruptions, to as low as 59 octaves below middle C on major eruptions.

Image gallery

See also

References

External links
 
 
 
 
 Fabian, A.C., et al. A deep Chandra observation of the Perseus cluster: shocks and ripples. Monthly Notices of the Royal Astronomical Society. Vol. 344 (2003): L43 (arXiv:astro-ph/0306036v2).
 The galaxy cluster Abell 426 (Perseus). A catalogue of 660 galaxy positions, isophotal magnitudes and morphological types, Brunzendorf, J.; Meusinger, H., Astronomy and Astrophysics Supplement, v.139, p. 141–161, 1999.
 The galaxy cluster Abell 426 (Perseus). A deep image of Abell 426
 Space.com article about "Sound of a Black Hole." in the Perseus cluster
 http://aida.astroinfo.org/
   Perseus A: Mysterious X-ray Signal Intrigues Astronomers

 
Galaxy clusters
Perseus (constellation)
Perseus-Pisces Supercluster
426
Abell richness class 2